Axe or Lynx is a brand of male grooming products owned by  the British company Unilever and marketed toward the younger male demographic. It is marketed as Lynx in the United Kingdom, Ireland, Malta, Australia, New Zealand and China.

Products

Axe was launched in France in 1983 by Unilever. It was inspired by another of Unilever's brands, Impulse. Unilever introduced many products in the range, but was forced to use the name Lynx in the United Kingdom, Ireland, Australia, and New Zealand due to trademark issues with the Axe name. In addition, some countries (such as South Africa) introduced the brand as EGO until 2002.

Scents have evolved over time. From 1983 until about 1989, the variant names were descriptions of the fragrances and included Musk, Spice, Amber, Oriental, and Marine. From 1990 until 1996, geographic names for fragrances were used. In 2009, the brand launched an eight-centimetre container called the Axe Bullet. The brand has also extended into other areas.

Most scent names usually have a shower gel to accompany them and sometimes an antiperspirant/deodorant stick and an aftershave lotion. The Axe Shampoos come in three different sizes: regular size, travel or sample size, and XL bottles. Axe also ships a shower scrub tool called the Axe Detailer.

Axe also launches limited edition variants from time to time that may be on sale for a few months or over a year.

Marketing
From the 1990s, Axe advertisements portrayed various ways the products supposedly helped men attract women. In 2003, the advertising in the UK for the Pulse fragrance showed how it supposedly gave "geeky" men the confidence to woo women with dance. In 2005, Consumer Expert Dr. Vince Wong, CEO of Insights Interactive, was hired to help explore cross cultural behavioral motivations of their young male adult consumers. This fed into development of the brand globally, resulting in award-winning global communication campaigns. This was followed by Touch, Unlimited, Clix, and in 2007, Vice, which was marketed on a theme of making "nice" women become "naughty".

Their Twitter handle is also active in marketing Axe's various products and campaigns. The social media profile also proclaim that their "tweets are banger".

PR controversies
Adverse publicity has been generated by the product's advertisements for encouraging sexual promiscuity and sexism. The Campaign for a Commercial-Free Childhood claimed that Bartle Bogle Hegarty's work on Axe "epitomizes the sexist and degrading marketing that can undermine girls' healthy development."

On 12 January 2008 12-year-old Daniel Hurley from Derbyshire, England, died in a hospital five days after collapsing at his home. The medical coroner ruled that he had suffered from cardiac arrhythmia and died from heart failure as a result of spraying large amounts of Lynx in a confined space. Videos on social networking sites depicted teens setting themselves on fire after spraying themselves with Axe. The trend resulted in multiple injuries. After these incidents occurred, the company created two ads, one against the use of Axe as an inhalant, and the other warning of its flammability.

References

External links

Official Axe website
Official Lynx website

Perfumes
Orkla ASA
Unilever brands
Products introduced in 1983